The Voltaic Progressive Front (FPV) was a political party in Upper Volta.

History
The party was established in 1977 as the Voltaic Progressive Union (Union Progressiste Voltaïque, UPV) by dissidents from several parties. The UPV received 16% of the vote in the April 1978 parliamentary elections, winning nine seats. It nominated Joseph Ki-Zerbo as its candidate in the presidential elections in May. Ki-Zerbo finished fourth in the four-man field with 16% of the vote.

In 1979 the party was renamed the Voltaic Progressive Front. It was banned in November 1980.

References

Defunct political parties in Burkina Faso
Political parties established in 1977
Political parties disestablished in 1980
1977 establishments in Upper Volta
1980 disestablishments in Africa